Peter Gabriel  is the second studio album by English singer-songwriter Peter Gabriel, released on 3 June 1978 by Charisma Records. Gabriel started recording the album in November 1977, the same month that he had completed touring in support of his debut solo release. He employed former King Crimson guitarist Robert Fripp, who was part of Gabriel's early touring band, to produce the album and incorporated his use of Frippertronics effects on the co-written "Exposure".

The album was released in the US as Peter Gabriel II. It later became known informally as Scratch, referring to the album's artwork by Hipgnosis. Some music streaming services refer to it as Peter Gabriel 2: Scratch.

The album reached No. 10 on the UK Albums Chart and No. 45 on the US Billboard Pop Albums chart.

Background

The influence of producer Robert Fripp is evident in the use of Frippertronics on the track "Exposure", which Fripp and Gabriel cowrote.  Fripp recorded a version of the song as the title track of his 1979 solo album Exposure.

Critical reception 

In the NME in 1978, Nick Kent wrote: "Its brazenly left-field veneer left me cold at first, and it's only now that its strengths are starting to come across ... once past the disarming non-focus veneer, there's a quietly remarkable talent at work – quiet in the manner of the slow fuse burn of 'Mother of Violence' with Roy Bittan's piano work outstripping anything he's turned out for either Bruce Springsteen or David Bowie. Closer to the root of the album, there's a purity, a strength to the songs individual enough to mark Gabriel out as a man whose creative zenith is close at hand."

Track listing

Notes
 On original LP pressings of the album, the audio of "White Shadow" (the last song on Side One) continued into a locked groove.
 Some editions of the cassette release had a different running order. "A Wonderful Day in a One-Way World" was track 11, "Home Sweet Home" was track 5, and "White Shadow" was track 4.
 The original B-side of the single "D.I.Y." is a longer version of "Perspective" edited for the album and all subsequent releases.

Personnel 
Peter Gabriel – vocals; Hammond organ on 11; piano on 2; synthesizer on 5, 7
Robert Fripp – electric guitar on 1, 3, 5, 10; acoustic guitar on 5; Frippertronics on 8
Tony Levin – bass guitar on 1, 5, 7, 8, 10, 11; Chapman stick on 2, 4, 9; string bass on 6; recorder arrangements on 6, 9; backing vocals on 1, 4, 7, 10, 11
Roy Bittan – keyboards on 1, 3, 5, 6, 10, 11
Larry Fast – synthesizer, treatments on 1, 2, 5, 7, 10
Jerry Marotta – drums on all except 3; backing vocals on 1, 4, 10, 11
Sid McGinnis – electric guitar on 1, 4, 8, 9, 10, 11; acoustic guitar on 2, 3; steel guitar on 3, 4, 5, 6, 9, 11; mandolin on 2; backing vocals on 7
Bayeté (Todd Cochran) – keyboards on 2, 4, 6, 7
Tim Cappello – saxophone on 10, 11
George Marge – recorder on 6, 8, 9
John Tims – insects on 3

Charts

Notes

External links 
 

Peter Gabriel albums
1978 albums
Albums with cover art by Hipgnosis
Albums produced by Robert Fripp
Atlantic Records albums
Charisma Records albums